Keaau High School is a public high school built in 1999 and located in Keaau, Hawaii.

History 
The school is operated by the Hawaii State Department of Education. It was built to avoid overcrowding at Waiakea High School in Hilo and Pahoa High and Intermediate School in Pāhoa. The first senior class was in 2003, when a new sports stadium was completed.

The school has been known for its excellent Career and Technical Education department.

The school's mascot is the cougar.

Alma mater 
By views of mountains and ocean blue,
Stands dear Keaʻau High School.
With spirit of navy and red we share,
Loyalty and honor we promise to thee.
Forever in our hearts we hold thee,
Cougars! We will always be!
Forever in our hearts we hold thee,
Cougars! We will always be!

Athletics 
Keaʻau High School offers a wide variety of sports.

Fall 
 Bowling
 Cross country
 Football
 Volleyball (girls')

Winter 
 Basketball
 Diving
 Paddling
 Soccer
 Swimming
 Wrestling

Spring 
 Baseball
 Golf
 Judo
 Softball
 Tennis
 Track and field

Full year 
 Cheerleading

Clubs 

Service clubs
 Interact Club
 Peace For The Roots
 Cougar Captioning Club
 Students Helping Students

Academic clubs
 Avid Club
 Cougar Tech Club (robotics)
 FFA (Future Farmers of America)
 HOSA
 National Honor Society
 Science Olympiad
 Skills USA
 STEM Club

Social clubs
 Dance Club
 Fanimation
 Geology Club
 Puna Taiko
 Sign Language Club
 Spectrum

Electives 
 Band
 Body Conditioning 1&2
 Chorus
 Computer Programming
 Culinary 1&2
 Hawaiian Language
 Photography
 Piano
 Sign Language
 Spanish Language
 Team Sports 1&2
 Ukulele
 Weight Lifting 1&2
 Yearbook

References

External links
Keaau High School official website

Public high schools in Hawaii County, Hawaii
Educational institutions established in 1999
1999 establishments in Hawaii